Girl, Positive (typically stylized as "Girl, Posi+ive") is a 2007 Lifetime Television movie, following the story of Rachel, a preppy teenage girl who discovers she is HIV positive after a summer one-night stand with a boy. The film stars Andrea Bowen and Jennie Garth.

Plot summary
Rachel (Andrea Bowen), a high school girl, seems to have the life that most people envy: she has a steady boyfriend, great friends, and a place on the school's soccer team. Preparing for college and separating from her boyfriend are the main worries of this teen, as she lives a carefree life like most girls her age. However, Rachel's world falls apart the day she discovers that Jason (Erik von Detten), the guy whom she lost her virginity to at a party and died in a car accident a few months ago, was HIV positive and a heavy IV drug user.

Rachel immediately goes to an AIDS clinic to get a rapid swab test, which comes back positive. Devastated by the fact that she may actually be infected with the virus, Rachel then confides in her substitute teacher, Sarah (Jennie Garth), who has secretly been living with the disease for years. But both young women are about to find out their secrets will not be kept secret for very long, as word begins to spread throughout their high school and rumors fly, making some of these students realize that they may not be as "invincible" as they think they are.

Accolades
Television Academy Honors

External links

Rotten Tomatoes

Lifetime (TV network) films
2007 television films
2007 films
HIV/AIDS in American films
American teen drama films
Films directed by Peter Werner
HIV/AIDS in television
Television Academy Honors winners
American drama television films
2000s English-language films
2000s American films